Lake Passagassawakeag (also known as Randall Pond) is a lake in Waldo County, Maine and is drained by the Passagassawakeag River.

References

Lakes of Waldo County, Maine
Lakes of Maine